The Council of Women World Leaders, created in 1996, is a network of 83 current and former presidents and prime ministers. It is the only organization in the world dedicated to women heads of state and government. The council's Ministerial Initiative also involves current and former cabinet ministers and secretaries in the work of the council.

Leadership

Chair Emeritae

Members

Members currently serving as heads of state or government

Members who previously served as heads of state or government

Deceased members

See also
List of elected and appointed female heads of state and government
United Nations Foundation
Women Political Leaders

References

External links
 Official website
 
 Council of Women World Leaders on Facebook 

International women's organizations
Organizations established in 1996
Women's occupational organizations